The 56th Utah State Legislature was elected Tuesday, November 2, 2004 and convened on Monday, January 17, 2005.

Dates of sessions

2005 General Session: January 17, 2005 - March 2, 2005
2005 First Special Session: April 19–20, 2005
2005 Second Special Session: November 9, 2005
2006 General Session: January 16, 2006 - March 1, 2006
2006 Third Special Session: May 24, 2006
2006 Fourth Special Session: September 19, 2006

Leadership

Utah Senate

 President of the Senate: John L. Valentine (R-14)

Majority (Republican) Leadership

 Majority Leader: Peter C. Knudson (R-17)
 Majority Whip: Dan R. Eastman (R-23)
 Assistant Majority Whip: Beverly Evans (R-26)

Minority (Democratic) Leadership

 Minority Leader: Mike Dmitrich (D-27)
 Minority Whip: Gene Davis (D-3)
 Assistant Minority Whip: Karen Hale (D-7)
 Minority Caucus Manager: Ed Mayne (D-5)

Utah House of Representatives

 Speaker of the House: Greg Curtis (R-49)

Majority (Republican) Leadership

 Majority Leader: Jeff Alexander (R-62)
 Majority Whip: Stephen H. Urquhart (R-75)
 Assistant Majority Whip: Ben C. Ferry (R-2)

Minority (Democratic) Leadership

 Minority Leader: Ralph Becker (D-24)
 Minority Whip: Brad King (D-69)
 Assistant Minority Whip: Patricia Jones (D-40)
 Minority Caucus Manager: Rosalind McGee (D-28)

Utah Senate

Make-up

Members

Utah House of Representatives

Make-up

Members

Employees/Staff
 Legislative Research Library and Information Center
 Office of Legislative Printing
 Office of the Legislative Auditor General
 Office of the Legislative Fiscal Analyst
 Office of Legislative Research and General Counsel

See also
 Utah State Legislature
 2008 Election Results
 Office of the Governor
 List of Utah State Legislatures

Legislature
56
2000s in Utah
2005 in Utah
2006 in Utah
2005 U.S. legislative sessions
2006 U.S. legislative sessions